South Carolina Highway 146 (SC 146) is a  South Carolina state highway running through Central Greenville County and south-western Spartanburg County.

Route description
SC 146's western terminus is at Laurens Road (U.S. Route 276 or US 276), near the intersection of Interstates 85 (I-85) and 385. Its course then goes in a southeasterly direction where its eastern terminus is at its intersection with SC 56 near Cross Anchor.

From its western terminus to its split from SC 417, SC 146 is known as Woodruff Road. From its split to the merger with SC 101, SC 146 is known as 3rd Street. Once SC 146/SC 101 merges with US 221 in Woodruff it is known as Main Street, then Laurens Road as it splits from SC 101. Its final name change happens when SC 146 splits from US 221 just outside Woodruff; its name changes to Cross Anchor Highway, and it keeps that name until it reaches its eastern terminus.

History

Major intersections

See also

References

External links

SC 146 at Virginia Highways' South Carolina Highways Annex

146
Transportation in Greenville County, South Carolina
Transportation in Spartanburg County, South Carolina
Transportation in Greenville, South Carolina